Aleksandar Marton (born 4 October 1959), known by his stage name Sandy Marton, is a Croatian singer, songwriter and musician. He is famous for songs such as "People from Ibiza", "Exotic and Erotic", and "Camel by Camel" (the song used in the "Ankha Zone" yiff animation and subsequent memes).

Biography

Early life 
Sandy Marton was born Aleksandar Marton in Zagreb, Yugoslavia on 4 October 1959. His father worked for the Yugoslavian Embassy in Italy, which led Marton to spend increasing amounts of time there. He moved to the Italian city of Milan in the 1970s.

1980s: debut and success 
In 1982, Marton was noticed by talent scout Claudio Cecchetto performing at the Primadonna nightclub in Milan. Realizing his commercial potential as a teen idol, Cecchetto signed him on, and Marton made his debut the following year under the pseudonym M. Basic with a single entitled "Ok Run". It would later garner attention from being used in commercials about the Philips Videopac. In 1984, with the definitive name Sandy Marton, Cecchetto officially launched him on the record market with the English-language dance single "People from Ibiza", composed by Marton himself. His carefully studied look, which included flowing blond hair with a keytar over his shoulder and extra-large jackets made him instantly recognizable, and Marton became an idol for young girls. The song gained traction on the Italian disco scene until it climbed the Italian charts until it reached the number-one position in October 1984, becoming his one and only number-one hit.

In 1985, he confirmed his popularity on the charts and in discos by releasing two more successful singles in the same genre: "Camel by Camel" and "Exotic & Erotic". "Exotic & Erotic" was released in Australia in 1986 and became a surprise Top 10 hit, despite receiving little airplay, due to the song's popularity in nightclubs and discos. Cecchetto's publicity stunts led to Marton becoming one of the most frequent guests of Vittorio Salvetti's Festivalbar, broadcast on television by Canale 5. The following year he released his first album, Modern Lover, featuring the title track, "Modern Lovers", which would become Marton's third top-ten hit in Italy. Given the success of the singer, Cecchetto founded the production house Marton Corporation and the record label Ibiza Records. However, starting in 1987, his mainstream popularity started declining although his singles still managed to chart high. In 1989 following the release of his final top-ten single "La Paloma Blanca", Marton largely retired from the music business owing to his status as an idol, along with management issues.

Later life 
Having retired to private life on the island of Ibiza, to which he owes his popularity, he attempted an occasional return to the scene in 1996 with a second and final album, Erase una Vez, without obtaining much success. In 2001 he participated in the transmission La notte flies, a musical competition among the most famous songs of the 1980s, in which he presented "People From Ibiza" and reached the semifinals. In 2005 he participated in the third edition of the Rai 2 reality TV show L'Isola dei famosi, which started on 21 September, but retired on 17 October citing health problems, despite there being no clinical reasons to justify the abandonment. He was replaced by Maurizio Ferrini in subsequent editions of the program, though he would often be present in the studio as a commentator.

Discography

Albums
 Modern Lover (1986)
 Erase Una Vez (1994)

Singles (as lead artist)

Singles (as featured artist)
 Sound Of Ibiza (The Bootstraps, Feat. Sandy Marton) (2008)

References

Sources

External links 

 
 
 

1959 births
20th-century Croatian male singers
21st-century Croatian male singers
Living people
Musicians from Zagreb
Croatian people of American descent
English-language singers from Croatia
Italo disco musicians